Vice-Admiral Sidney Robert Drury-Lowe  (19 October 1871 – 24 January 1945) was a British Royal Navy officer.

Biography
Sidney was born on 19 October 1871 in the United Kingdom.

He began his military service as a Sub-Lieutenant on 14 May 1891 and was promoted to Lieutenant in on the same day in 1892. However, Drury-Lowe was suspended from his post for "disturbances" in the Portsmouth naval barracks in 1906. Drury-Lowe  married Clare Susan Charteris in 1909 and had a daughter, Pamela Jocelyn, who was born in 1911.

He was again promoted to captain on 30 June 1909. On 23 November, he was injured in his foot after exiting a boat in a seaway and temporarily transferred command to Raymond Fitzmaurice.

He became president of the Committee of Fire Control Tables from August 39, 1919, until 10 December 1920. Drury-Lowe was promoted to Rear-Admiral on 19 February 1920 and promoted to Vice-Admiral after his retirement on 12 August 1925. He died from heart failure on 24 January 1945 at St Annes-on-Sea and was cremated on 26 January.

References

Bibliography
"Deaths" (Deaths). The Times. Friday, 26 January 1945. Issue 50051, col A, pg. 1.
"Vice-Admiral S. R. Drury-Lowe" (Obituaries). The Times. Saturday, 27 January 1945. Issue 50052, col D, pg. 6.

External links
 

1871 births
1945 deaths
Royal Navy vice admirals
Royal Navy officers of World War I
Companions of the Order of St Michael and St George